Byumba is a city in northern Rwanda, and is the capital of Gicumbi District. It is home to an SOS Children's Village.

Population
, the human population in Byumba was estimated at 75,463.

Economic activity
Banque Populaire du Rwanda (BPR), maintains a branch in Byumba.

Education
 University of Technology and Arts at Byumba (UTAB)

Notable people 

 Marie Béatrice Umutesi, writer
 Donald Kaberuka, economist

References

External links
For population
SOS children's village

Northern Province, Rwanda
Populated places in Rwanda